2nd Nikolskoye (Russian: 2-е Никольское) is a rural locality (a selo) and the administrative center of Nikolaskoye Rural Settlement of Bobrovsky District, Russia. The population was 675 as of 2010.

Streets 
 Belyachki
 Mira
 Molodezhnaya
 Sovetskaya
 Shkolnaya

Geography 
2nd Nikolskoye is located 24 km west of Bobrov (the district's administrative centre) by road. Razdolny is the nearest rural locality.

References

External links 
 2nd Nikolskoye on komandirovka.ru

Rural localities in Bobrovsky District